Food biodiversity is defined as "the diversity of plants, animals and other organisms used for food, covering the genetic resources within species, between species and provided by ecosystems."   

Food biodiversity can be considered from two main perspectives: production and consumption. From a consumption perspective, food biodiversity describes the diversity of foods in human diets and their contribution to dietary diversity, cultural identity and good nutrition. Production of food biodiversity looks at the thousands of food products, such as fruits, nuts, vegetables, meat and condiments sourced from agriculture and from the wild (e.g. forests, uncultivated fields, water bodies). Food biodiversity covers the diversity between species, for example different animal and crop species, including those considered neglected and underutilized species. Food biodiversity also comprises the diversity within species, for example different varieties of fruit and vegetables, or different breeds of animals.

Food diversity, diet diversity nutritional diversity, are also terms used in the new diet culture spawned by Brandon Eisler, in the study known as Nutritional Diversity.

Consumption of food biodiversity

Food biodiversity, nutrition, and health 
Promoting diversity of foods and species consumed in human diets in particular has potential co-benefits for public health as well as sustainable food systems perspective.

Food biodiversity provides necessary nutrients for quality diets and is an essential part of local food systems, cultures and food security. Promoting diversity of foods and species consumed in human diets in particular has potential co-benefits for sustainable food systems. Nutritionally, diversity in food is associated with higher micronutrient adequacy of diets. On average, per additional species consumed, mean adequacy of vitamin A, vitamin C, folate, calcium, iron, and zinc increased by 3%. From a conservation point of view, diets based on a wide variety of species place less pressure on single species.

Furthermore, food biodiversity, as measured by the absolute number of biological species in the usual diet, was negatively associated with total mortality rate and cause-specific deaths due to cancer, heart disease, respiratory disease, and digestive disease among ~450,000 adults from nine European countries.

Production of food biodiversity

Role of biodiversity in production systems 
Conservation and management of broad-based genetic diversity within the domesticated species have been improving agricultural production for 10,000 years. However, diverse natural populations have been providing food and other products for much longer. High biodiversity can maximize production levels, which are sustained through beneficial impact of ecosystem services for agricultural, modified and natural ecosystems. Conversely, reliance on a narrow portfolio of crops or crop varieties can jeopardize food production systems. This is illustrated by the Great Famine of Ireland. Potatoes were introduced into Ireland from the New World in about 1600 and they became the major food source of most Irish people. The wind-borne Potato blight fungus spread throughout the country In 1845-1847 and caused almost complete failure of the potato crop. It is estimated that 1 million people died of starvation, cholera and typhoid.

Ecosystem services 
A wide range of biologically diverse populations in natural ecosystems and in / near agricultural ecosystems maintain essential ecological functions that are critical for the production of food. Such populations contribute positively to, for example, nutrient cycling, decomposition of organic matter, crusted or degraded soil rehabilitation, pest and disease regulation, water quality maintenance, and pollination. Maintaining species diversity, while building on and enhancing ecosystem functions, reduces external input requirements by increasing nutrient availability, improving water use and soil structure, and controlling pests.

Traits 
Genetic diversity within food species is a source of useful genes with a variety of benefits. For example:

 Wild subspecies of tomatoes (Solanum lycopersicum chmielewskii) were crossbred with cultivated tomato species. After 10 generations, new tomato strains with larger fruits were produced. There was a marked increase in pigmentation. The content of soluble solid, mainly fructose, glucose and other sugars increased.

 A barley plant from Ethiopia provides a gene that protects the barley crop from the lethal yellow dwarf virus.

 Host resistance gene, Xa21, from Oryza longistaminata is integrated into the genome of Oryza sativa for a broad range resistance to rice blight disease caused by Xanthomonas oryzae pv. oryzae

See also
 Biodiversity
 Agricultural biodiversity

References

External links
 Facilitating Mechanism of the Global Plan of Action for the Conservation and Sustainable Utilization of Plant Genetic Resources for Food and Agriculture
 Bioversity International

Biodiversity
Nutrition
Food and drink